Lucia Bronzetti (born 10 December 1998) is an Italian tennis player.

Bronzetti has career-high WTA rankings of No. 50 in singles and No. 375 in doubles. She has reached eight singles finals on the ITF Women's Circuit, with a record of five wins. Additionally, she has reached four doubles finals with a record of two wins.

Professional career
She made her WTA Tour main-draw debut at the 2021 Italian Open with a wildcard, partnering fellow Italian Nuria Brancaccio.

She made her Grand Slam tournament debut at the 2022 Australian Open as a qualifier where she reached second round defeating Varvara Gracheva for her first major match win, before losing to world No. 1, Ashleigh Barty.

Ranked No. 102 at the 2022 Miami Open on her debut at the WTA 1000 level, she reached fourth round as a lucky loser; she lost to Daria Saville in a 3 hour match, the third-longest women’s match of the event. As a result, she made her top 100 debut in the WTA singles rankings at world No. 85, on 4 April 2022.

Performance timelines

Only main-draw results in WTA Tour, Grand Slam tournaments, Fed Cup/Billie Jean King Cup and Olympic Games are included in win–loss records.

Singles
Current after the 2023 Indian Wells Open.

Doubles
Current after the 2023 Australian Open.

WTA career finals

Singles: 1 (runner-up)

WTA Challenger finals

Singles: 1 (runner-up)

ITF finals

Singles: 8 (5 titles, 3 runner–ups)

Doubles: 4 (2 titles, 2 runner–ups)

Notes

References

External links
 
 

1998 births
Living people
Italian female tennis players
People from Rimini
21st-century Italian women